Emily J. Long (born June 30, 1959) is an American politician and a member of the Democratic Party who has served in the Vermont House of Representatives since 2015.

Long serves on the House Committee on General, Housing, and Military Affairs, the House Rules Committee, and the Joint Rules Committee.

Long's legislative priorities include access to affordable health care, environmental conservation and sustainable energy, economic development, and education.

References

External links

1959 births
21st-century American politicians
21st-century American women politicians
Living people
Democratic Party members of the Vermont House of Representatives
People from Townshend, Vermont
Women state legislators in Vermont